Gianni Bortoletto (Chinese: 贾尼; born 4 May 1956 in Italy) is an Italian football manager.

References

Living people
Italian football managers
1956 births